Obit is the fifth book of poems written by Victoria Chang.

Awards 

Los Angeles Times Book Prize for Poetry in 2020
PEN/Voelcker Award for Poetry in 2021
Anisfield-Wolf Book Award
International runner-up for Griffin Poetry Prize
New York Times 100 Notable Books
Time's List of the 100 Best Novels
Best Book of the Year by NPR
Best Book of 2021 by The Boston Globe

References 

2020 poetry books